Cesar J. Rosas (born September 26, 1954, in Hermosillo, Mexico) is a Mexican singer, songwriter and guitarist for Los Lobos. Rosas also participates in the Latin supergroup Los Super Seven. Perhaps the most recognizable member of Los Lobos, Rosas is known for his trademark black sunglasses, goatee and black hair.  He plays guitar left handed.

Aside from live shows with Los Lobos, Cesar Rosas has been active as a session musician and sideman during the past several decades. In addition, he released a solo album, Soul Disguise, in February 1999, and toured after its release.

Personal life
Rosas has three daughters, Ruby, Amber and Victoria.

Rosas's wife, Sandra Rosas, was reported missing in 1999. Her half-brother, Gabriel Gómez, was tried, convicted of her murder, and sentenced to life in prison without the possibility of parole. Sandra Rosas' body was found on November 22, 2000, in Santa Clarita, CA.

Solo discography
Soul Disguise (1999)
Live from the Galaxy [recorded at the Galaxy Theater, Santa Ana, California, in 1999] (2015)La Fiesta'' (2016)

See also
List of kidnappings

References

External links
Cesar Rosas Interview NAMM Oral History Library (2019)

1954 births
Living people
People from Hermosillo
American singer-songwriters
American rock songwriters
American rock singers
American rock guitarists
American male guitarists
American male singer-songwriters
Los Lobos members
20th-century American guitarists
20th-century American male musicians